PS Royal Consort was a paddle steamship passenger vessel operated by the London and North Western Railway and the Lancashire and Yorkshire Railway from 1870 to 1890.

Description
A two-cylinder double-acting steam enging propelled the ship via paddle wheels. The engine was built by Tod & McGregor, Glasgow.

History
Royal Consort was built in 1844 by Tod & McGregor, Glasgow as yard number 9. She was launched on 2 August. She was originally owned by F. Kemp and Company and its subsidiary the North Lancashire Steam Navigation Company and was used on the Fleetwood to Ardrossan service. Her port of registry was Glasgow and the United Kingdom Official Number 17252 was allocated. On 18 March 1850 her port of registry was changed to Fleetwood. She also operated on the Glasgow to Derry service in 1851–52. On 14 December 1858, Royal Consort ran aground at Belfast, County Antrim whilst on a voyage from Fleetwood to Belfast. She was refloated.

At some point she was re-engined; the new engine was made by J. Jack & Co., Liverpool. The London and North Western Railway became joint owners in 1880. She was sold to A. & B. Stewart, Birkenhead, Cheshire in 1890 and was deleted from the shipping registers in 1891.

References

1844 ships
Passenger ships of the United Kingdom
Steamships
Ships built on the River Clyde
Paddle steamers of the United Kingdom
Maritime incidents in December 1858
Ships of the London and North Western Railway
Ships of the Lancashire and Yorkshire Railway